Mammillaria parkinsonii, also known as owl-eye pincushion or owl-eye cactus, is a species of flowering plant in the family Cactaceae. It is endemic to Queretaro, Mexico. Mammillaria parkinsonii is listed as Endangered due to a limited distribution (extent of occurrence ca 2,500 km2), severe fragmentation, a continuing decline due to illegal collection, and degradation of its habitat across its range. Clarification of the taxonomic status of this species is a research priority.

It was first described by Ehrenberg in 1840 in Linnaea 14: 375.

References

parkinsonii
Cacti of Mexico
Endemic flora of Mexico
Taxa named by Christian Gottfried Ehrenberg
Flora of Querétaro